Gregory Michael Hansell (born March 12, 1971) is a former baseball pitcher.

Career
Hansell played for four different major league ballclubs during his career: the Los Angeles Dodgers (1995), Minnesota Twins (1996), Milwaukee Brewers (1997), and Pittsburgh Pirates (1999).  He made his major league debut on April 28, 1995, and played his final game on October 3, 1999.

On December 7, 1999, Hansell was purchased from the Pittsburgh Pirates by the Hanshin Tigers of the Japan Central League.  Hansell would attempt a return to Major League Baseball in 2003, but failed to make the big league roster in tryouts with the New York Yankees and Arizona Diamondbacks.

External links

1971 births
Living people
Albuquerque Dukes players
American expatriate baseball players in Canada
American expatriate baseball players in Japan
American expatriate baseball players in Mexico
Bakersfield Dodgers players
Baseball players from California
Columbus Clippers players
Diablos Rojos del México players
Edmonton Trappers players
Gulf Coast Red Sox players
Hanshin Tigers players
Los Angeles Dodgers players
Major League Baseball pitchers
Mexican League baseball pitchers
Milwaukee Brewers players
Minnesota Twins players
Nashville Sounds players
Nippon Professional Baseball pitchers
Omaha Royals players
People from Greater Los Angeles
Pittsburgh Pirates players
Salt Lake Buzz players
San Antonio Missions players
St. Lucie Mets players
Trenton Thunder players
Tucson Sidewinders players
Tucson Toros players
Winter Haven Red Sox players